The 1966 United States Senate election in North Carolina was held on November 8, 1966. Incumbent Democratic Senator B. Everett Jordan was re-elected to a second term in office over Republican businessman John Shallcross. Democrats would not win this seat again 2008.

Democratic primary

Candidates
B. Everett Jordan, incumbent Senator since 1958
Hubert E. Seymour Jr., Greensboro attorney

Results

General election

Results

Footnotes

1966
North Carolina
Jesse Helms
1966 North Carolina elections